São José do Rio Preto is a municipality in the state of São Paulo, Brazil. The city is located at the northwest portion of the state, 440 km (273 mi) from the city of São Paulo and 700 km (435 mi) from Brasília. As of the 2021 census, the population of the city was 469,173 inhabitants making it the 11th largest city in the state of São Paulo and the 36th largest city in Brazil.

Also known as Rio Preto, it was founded in 1852 and its history is strongly linked to the commercial activity, provision of services, and agriculture.

Demographically, São José do Rio Preto is the principal city of the Mesoregion of São José do Rio Preto (population 1,569,220). In 2020, the Microregion of São José do Rio Preto had a population of 763,534 inhabitants.

The anniversary of the city is celebrated on the same day of Saint Joseph's Day.

History
Before the 19th century the region of São José do Rio Preto was inhabited by the Kaingang that were gradually reduced due to migration, bandeiras, and miscegenation.

The city was founded on March 19, 1852 by João Bernardino de Seixas Ribeiro (a migrant from Minas Gerais), when the local farmer Luiz Antônio da Silveira gave part of his lands to establish the new city as a devotion to the patron Saint Joseph.

São José do Rio Preto was officially established in 1894 and the territory ceased to be part of Jaboticabal.

The railway reached the city in 1912 after the expansions of the Araraquarense Railway (pt: Estrada de Ferro Araraquarense), once completed, the railway was an important factor for the development of São José do Rio Preto as the city served as a commercial center for people of the region, as well as a point for stocking and movement of goods between the region and the city of São Paulo.

Origin of the name
The literal translation is "Saint Joseph of the Black River". The name of the city comes from the junction of the words ''São José'' and ''Rio Preto'' respectively.

São José (Saint Joseph) is the patron saint of the city, and Rio Preto (en: black river) is the name given to the local river that crosses the city.

Between 1906 and 1944, the city was named Rio Preto. In 1944 there was a proposal to change the name to Iboruna (Black river in Tupi language) but this did not come to pass.

Geography
São José do Rio Preto is located in northwest of the state of São Paulo in a region between the rivers Grande, Paraná and Tietê.  The ecosystem in the region lies between the Cerrado (Brazilian savanna) with traces of the Atlantic Forest. Topographycally, it is characterized by a slightly undulated relief, with a medium elevation of 489 m (1,604 ft).

Climate
The climate in São José do Rio Preto is tropical (Aw), experiencing hot, rainy summers, and mild, dry winters.

The annual average temperature of 23 °C. The city receives on average between 1,300 mm (51.1 inches) and 1,500 mm (59 inches) of precipitation a year. In 2008, it was registered 1,593 mm (62.7 inches) of rain.

Neighborhoods 
North: Ipiguá and Onda Verde
South: Cedral and Bady Bassitt
East: Guapiaçu
West: Mirassol

Districts 

 South side: Engenheiro Schmitt 
 Extreme North side: Talhado

Economy
The service sector is the main economy of São José do Rio Preto representing 84,53% of the total income and followed by the industry (15,19%).

In 2020, the gross value of São José do Rio Preto was R$18,7 billion reais which makes it the 53rd largest economy in Brazil.

Over the decades the city has diversified as a regional hub being the home to medical centers, education institutions, parks, concert venues, and shopping centers.

The industrial park of the São José do Rio Preto is composed of 03 industrial districts and 13 mini-districts, the primary employers are small and medium-sized businesses which were accounted 75 companies.

Agriculture and livestock represents less than 1% of the GDP. The main products are Sugarcane, Rubber, Orange, and Maize.

Demographics

According to the Brazilian HDI, São José do Rio Preto's value for 2010 was rated as High (0,797) positioning it at 50 out of 5.565 Brazilian municipalities, and 27 out of 645 municipalities of São Paulo.

Religion 
The city is home to the Diocese of São José do Rio Preto, a local heritage located in the same place the first chapel was built in 1852. The cathedral is also the ground zero of the city and containing art works which includes a 19th-century sculpture of Saint Joseph.

As of the 2010 census the population in the city is made up of Roman Catholics (58.7%), Brazilian Protestants (23.79%), Spiritists (6.81%), People with no religion (5.57%), Witnesses of Jehovah (1.47%), Atheists (0.38%), Church of Jesus Christ of Latter-day Saints (0.18%), Buddhists (0.18%), Umbanda and Candomblé (0.17%), Eastern Orthodox (0.07%), and Jewish (0.03%).

Public Security 
São José do Rio Preto recorded 2018 the most violent year in 16 years, recording 45 murders against 47 in 2002. In 2019 the number of homicides decreased to 24 but rose to 30 in the following year, on the other hand the number of robberies slightly reduced in 2020 registering 968 against 1.258 in the previous year.

Indicators
Population: 464,983 (2020)
Households: 137,233 (2010)
Area (2020): 431.31 km2 (166.5 sq mi)
Urban area: 117.43 km2 (45.3 sq mi)
Population density (2020): 946.53/km2 (2,451.5/sq mi)
Urbanization: 93.9% (2010)
Sex ratio (Males to Females): 92.58 (2012)
Birth rate: 12.63/1,000 inhabitants (2011)
Infant mortality: 7.11/1,000 births (2011)
Literacy rate: 96.8 (2010) 
Number of vehicles: 405.608 (2020) 

Sources: SEADE, IBGE.

Culture

Music 
The Symphony Orchestra of São José do Rio Preto is a non-profit institution founded in 1942 and the oldest in the city. It was listed as a historical heritage.

Literature 
The Public Library of São Jose do Rio Preto (Dr. Fernando Costa) currently holds about 46,000 volumes. It was officially opened in 1943.

Theater 
 
The city is home to a number of local concert venues, including: The Primitivist Art Museum (MAP), Naif - Art Museum, The Public Archive, The Municipal Theater (Humberto Sinibaldi Neto), The municipal theater: Paulo Moura, and so on.

There are also cultural events such as The International Theater Festival (FIT), and the Book Biennial (Bienal do Livro).

Parque da Represa 
Is an urban linear park located in the west side of São José do Rio Preto. It was opened to the public in 1955 in order to improve the water supply in the city and preserve local aspects of the nature along the bank of the black river. In 2011, it was installed new trails and a bike path across the length of the park. Today the park contains a variety of over 10 000 native species of local fauna, kiosks and free outdoor gym equipments.

Infrastructure

Healthcare
São José do Rio Preto is home to eight general medical hospitals: one public, four private, and three philanthropic. In 2009 the city was home to 157 medical facilities of which 124 were private hospitals with a total of 1611 beds, and 33 public hospitals with a total of 28 beds.

Education
The Hospital de Base (FAMERP) is the second largest teaching hospital in Brazil. In 2010, it was reported a total of 860 physicians and 4,100 employees providing 3,500 inpatients per month and 708 beds. The hospital currently supports around 1.5 million residents in 101 municipalities. It is renowned for the successful transplant procedures, recording 292 procedures in 2010. The Children's hospital (HCM) was opened in 2013 with 255 beds in the FAMERP campus and currently being the largest pediatric hospital in Brazil.

In 2018, it was registered 48,200 enrollments in Primary School, and 15,335 enrollments in Secondary school. In 2017, it was also registered 27,352 enrollments for Higher education.

The city is served by 36 public schools, 51 private schools from Preschool to Secondary education, and other 153 public schools operated by the municipality through elementary schools, middle schools, and high schools.

Rio Preto is also served by 02 public universities: IBILCE (Biosciences, languages, and exact sciences), FATEC (Technology), and a relevant number of for-profit institutions.

Transportation

Bus
There are 2 companies operating the public transit system in the municipality with 230 buses on 80 different routes: Circular Santa Luzia, and Itamarati.

Rail 
Rumo Logística is currently operating freight transport in São José do Rio Preto.

Air
The Airport of São José do Rio Preto (Prof. Eribelto Manoel Reino Airport) has service on 03 commercial airlines with flights to São Paulo, Campinas, Guarulhos, Cuiabá and Porto Seguro.

Roads 
 SP-310 (Washington Luís - State highway) - São Paulo (450 km / 280 mi)
 BR-153 (Transbrasiliana - Federal highway) - Brasília (700 km / 435 mi)
 SP-425 (Assis Chateaubriand - State highway) - Presidente Prudente (267 km / 165 mi)
 SP-427 (Délcio Custódio da Silva - State highway) - Mirassolândia (25 km / 15.5 mi)

Media  
Three daily newspapers are published in São José do Rio Preto: Diário da Região, and Bom Dia.

Brazilian free-to-air TV network Rede Vida is headquartered in São José do Rio Preto. The channel broadcasts catholic programming such as TV masses, novenas and rosaries, news, variety shows, and sports coverage broadcasting programing through the affiliates and satellite services in almost the entire Brazilian territory.

Sports
 
The city is home to América Futebol Clube, and Rio Preto Esporte Clube.

América Futebol Clube usually plays in the Teixeirão Stadium which owns a total capacity of over 32,000 people.

Rio Preto Esporte Clube, plays in the Rio Pretão (Stadium Anisio Haddad) with a capacity of 17,000.

The Rio Preto Weilers is an American football team based in São José do Rio Preto. It was founded in 2010 by the initiative of a group of enthusiasts who intended to disseminate their sport in the city and other regions in Brazil. 

The Weilers compete in the Liga BFA - Elite, and has already won 2 national titles, and 1 state. The team also support alternative sport groups with disabilities including wheelchair basketball, swimming groups, and more. These groups are formed by philanthropic members of the Clube Amigos dos Deficientes (Friends of Disabled, Club) that also compete at national level.

International relations

São José do Rio Preto is twinned  with:
 Nantong, Jiangsu – China

References

External links

  City Hall's Official Site

 
1852 establishments in Brazil
Populated places established in the 19th century